The first courtyard is one of four at Prague Castle, in Prague, Czech Republic. Wrestling Titans is installed at the courtyard's entrance.

External links

 

Prague Castle